The quad doubles wheelchair tennis competition at the 2008 Summer Paralympics in Beijing was held from 10 September to 13 September at the Olympic Green Tennis Centre. The DecoTurf surface rendered the event a hardcourt competition.

Medalists

Calendar

Seeds
  (champions, gold medalists)
  (semifinals, bronze medalists)

Draw

Key 

 INV = Bipartite invitation
 IP = ITF place
 ALT = Alternate
 r = Retired
 w/o = Walkover

Finals

References 
 

Quad Doubles